Tessy van de Ven (born 8 July 1983) is a former professional tennis player from the Netherlands.

Born in Woerden, van de Ven spent her career on the ITF Circuit, playing her first tournament in 2000. 

She had her best year on tour in 2004 when she won three of her four ITF singles titles and represented the Netherlands in two Fed Cup ties, partnering Anousjka van Exel in doubles rubbers against Ukraine and South Africa.

ITF Circuit finals

Singles: 6 (4 titles, 2 runner-ups)

Doubles: 9 (5 titles, 4 runner-ups)

See also
 List of Netherlands Fed Cup team representatives

References

External links
 
 
 

1983 births
Living people
Dutch female tennis players
People from Woerden
Sportspeople from Utrecht (province)
20th-century Dutch women
21st-century Dutch women